Gustaaf Sorel (17 January 1905, in Ostend – 14 May 1981, in Ostend) was a Belgian painter and draughtsman known for his representations of gloomy people and bleak street sights.

Gallery

References

External links
 

1905 births
1980 deaths
20th-century Belgian painters